Lashonda Lester (died April 6, 2017) was an American stand-up comedian from Austin, Texas. Her posthumous debut album, Shondee Superstar, was released by Dan Schlissel's Stand Up! Records in 2019, and was critically praised. John-Michael Bond of Paste magazine called her "a rare talent with a preternatural gift for razor-sharp storytelling." Marc Maron called her a "funny, authentic, hard-working comic who had her own voice. ... That’s an honest comic. The best kind."

Early life
Lester was born in Detroit, Michigan. As a child, she was a voiceover actress in local commercials. She developed an early interest in comedy, memorizing routines by Redd Foxx, Slappy White, George Carlin, and Richard Pryor. She worked various jobs, including as a wrestling promoter and a madam.

Career
Lester moved to Austin in 2004 to work in politics, and began performing stand-up in 2008. She became known for creating and starring in the darkly comic biography series Weird! True Hollywood Tales, which ran for five seasons at Austin's Salvage Vanguard Theater.

She performed frequently on television, including NickMom Night Out in 2013, the PBS series Stand Up Empire in 2016, and Fox's Laughs in 2017. She was chosen as one of the top 100 comics on season 9 of the NBC show Last Comic Standing in 2015.	

In 2016, Lester won the prestigious annual "Funniest Person in Austin" competition at Austin's Cap City Comedy Club, the first black comedian to win the award. Her win was captured in the 2016 documentary Funniest, directed by Katie Pengra and  Dustin Svehlak. In 2016, the Austin Chronicle gave Lester a special award in its Best of 2016 issue, "Best Unstoppable Comedy Dynamo".

Lester was increasingly well known nationally when she died in 2017. She had recently received critical praise for a high-profile performance with Marc Maron and was due to record her first special for the TV series Comedy Central Stand-Up Presents later that year. Several national publications, including Paste and Vulture, published lengthy obituaries after her death.

Personal life
Lester and her husband, Dana, had a son.

Health issues and death
Lester was diagnosed with a chronic kidney disease in 2015, and had been hospitalized prior to her death. She underwent dialysis four times a week, often using the time to write new material.

Discography
Shondee Superstar (Stand Up! Records, 2019)

Shondee Superstar was well received by critics. Writing in Paste, Bond called the album "a lovely introduction to a voice that’s both purely unique and universally relatable." Valerie Lopez and Lara Smith of Comedy Wham called the album  "superb" and praised Lester's "knack for storytelling" and ability to "turn a simple phrase with perfect timing and absolutely slay an audience."

Podcast appearances
Comedy Wham, "Lashonda Lester: The Kitten From Murder Mitten" (April 19, 2016)
The Savage and Starbuck Show, "A Conversation With Lashonda Lester" (Oct. 23, 2014)

References

External links
Lashonda Lester at Stand Up! Records website
 

1970s births
2017 deaths
American women comedians
African-American stand-up comedians
American stand-up comedians
People from Austin, Texas
People from Detroit
Comedians from Texas
Comedians from Michigan
21st-century American comedians
Stand Up! Records artists
21st-century American women
21st-century African-American women
20th-century African-American people
20th-century African-American women